is a terminal station on the Hiroden Miyajima Line located in Miyajima-guchi, Hatsukaichi, Hiroshima, Japan.

Routes
From Hiroden-miyajima-guchi Station, there is one of Hiroden Tram route on Hiroden Miyajima Line.
 Hiroshima Station - Hiroden-miyajima-guchi Route

Connections
█ Miyajima  Line

Hiroden-ajina － Hiroden-miyajima-guchi
Hiroden-ajina － (Kyoteijo-mae) － Hiroden-miyajima-guchi

Other services connections

JR lines
JR lines connections at JR Miyajimaguchi Station

Ferry service routes
There are ferry services for Miyajima.
█ JR Miyajima Ferry
█ Miyajima Matsudai Liner

Bus service routes

Around station

History
Opened as "Densha Miyajima" on February 1, 1931.
Renamed to "Hiroden-miyajima" on June 1, 1961.
Renamed to "Hiroden-miyajima-guchi" on November 1, 2001.

See also

Hiroden Streetcar Lines and Routes

References 

Hiroden Miyajima Line stations
Railway stations in Japan opened in 1931